Pedro Hernández (born 19 March 1955) is a Cuban fencer. He competed at the 1976 and 1980 Summer Olympics.

References

1955 births
Living people
Cuban male fencers
Olympic fencers of Cuba
Fencers at the 1976 Summer Olympics
Fencers at the 1980 Summer Olympics
Pan American Games medalists in fencing
Pan American Games gold medalists for Cuba
Fencers at the 1979 Pan American Games
20th-century Cuban people
21st-century Cuban people